Rose Marie is a 1954 American musical western film adaptation of the 1924 operetta of the same name, the third to be filmed by Metro-Goldwyn-Mayer, following a 1928 silent movie and the best-known of the three, the 1936 Jeanette MacDonald-Nelson Eddy version. It is directed by Mervyn LeRoy and stars Ann Blyth, Howard Keel and Fernando Lamas. This version is filmed in the Canadian Rockies in CinemaScope. It was MGM's first US produced film in the new widescreen medium (having been preceded by the British-made Knights of the Round Table), and the first movie musical of any studio to be released in this format. It was part of a revival of large-budget operetta films produced in the mid-1950s.

The story adheres closely to that of the original libretto, unlike the 1936 version. It is somewhat altered by a tomboy-to-lady conversion for the title character.

Plot
Rose Marie Lemaitre, an orphan living in the Canadian wilderness, falls in love with her guardian, Mike Malone, an officer of the Royal Canadian Mounted Police. The feeling is mutual But, when she leaves to learns proper etiquette, she meets a trapper named James Duval, who also falls for her.

Soundtrack
Only three numbers are retained from the original musical: "Rose Marie", "Indian Love Call", and "The Mounties". Five new songs were written for the film: "The Right Place For A Girl", "Free To Be Free", "The Mountie Who Never Got His Man", "I Have The Love", and "Love And Kisses". The latter was filmed, but deleted from the release print (it is included on the DVD version of the film). An Indian totem dance with choreography by Busby Berkeley (his last) takes the place of the original number "Totem Tom Tom". This new number does not make use of that song's music or lyric, despite a claim otherwise on the DVD cover.

Cast
 Ann Blyth as Rose Marie Lemaitre
 Howard Keel as Captain Mike Malone
 Fernando Lamas as James Severn Duval
 Bert Lahr as Barney McCorkle
 Marjorie Main as Lady Jane Dunstock
 Joan Taylor as Wanda
 Ray Collins as Inspector Appleby
 Chief Yowlachie as Black Eagle

Reception
According to MGM records the film earned $2,835,000 in the US and Canada and $2,442,000 elsewhere, resulting in a loss of $284,000.

References

External links
 
 
 
 

1954 films
American romantic musical films
1954 Western (genre) films
American Western (genre) musical films
Films directed by Mervyn LeRoy
Metro-Goldwyn-Mayer films
Royal Canadian Mounted Police in fiction
Films about law enforcement in Canada
Operetta films
Films directed by Frank Tashlin
Remakes of American films
1950s romantic musical films
CinemaScope films
1950s English-language films
1950s American films
1950s Western (genre) musical films